The Wandflue (also spelled Wandfluh) is a mountain of the Bernese Alps, located on the border between the Swiss cantons of Fribourg and Bern. It lies south of Jaun in the Gastlosen chain.

References

External links
 Wandflue on Hikr

Mountains of the Alps
Mountains of Switzerland
Mountains of the canton of Fribourg
Mountains of the canton of Bern
Bern–Fribourg border
Two-thousanders of Switzerland